Bryce Brian Miranda (born 23 September 1999) is an Indian professional footballer who plays as a winger for Indian Super League club Kerala Blasters.

Club career

Youth and early career
Born in Mumbai, Bryce started his schooling at Don Bosco School where he also played for the school team. He  represented all age group teams of Mumbai FC up to U-18 level. Later he played for Union Bank FC in different tournaments. In 2018, Bryce was signed by FC Goa and was put into their developmental side. A year later, he joined Income Tax FC where he had a breakout season, scoring three goals and providing 10 assists in the 2019–2020 Mumbai Elite division.

Churchill Brothers
On 22 November 2020, Bryce signed for the I-League side Churchill Brothers. On 10 January 2021, Bryce made his professional debut for Churchill Brothers in the I-league match against Indian Arrows. He started in every match during the season, bagging a goal and three assists. During the 2021–22 I-League, Bryce made 16 appearances and made one assist for the club.

Kerala Blasters 
On 15 June 2022, Indian Super League club Kerala Blasters FC announced the signing of Bryce from Churchill Brothers FC  for an undisclosed transfer fee. He signed a multi-year deal, which would keep him with the club until 2026. Bryce made his debut for the Blasters on 28 October 2022 in a 2–0 loss against Mumbai City FC by coming as a substitute for Adrian Luna in the 92nd minute. On 26 December 2022, he made his first assist in Indian Super League, where he provided assist to Sandeep Singh's goal in the 86th minute, after coming as a substitute in the 83rd minute helping the Blasters in a 1–0 win against Odisha FC. On 29 January 2023, Bryce made his first start for the Blasters in the season against NorthEast United FC and provided an assist for the Dimitrios Diamantakos' goal in the 42nd minute, helping in a 2–0 win.

International career
Miranda was called-up for the India’s U-23 camp for the 2022 AFC U-23 Asian Cup qualifiers, which was held at UAE in October 2021. He made his debut on 30 October 2021 against Kyrgyzstan, coming in as a substitute for Vikram Pratap Singh.

Career statistics

Club

References

Living people
1999 births
Indian footballers
India youth international footballers
Churchill Brothers FC Goa players
Association football midfielders
Footballers from Mumbai
I-League players
I-League 2nd Division players
Goa Professional League players
Kerala Blasters FC players
Indian Super League players